Xiping may refer to:

Locations in China
Xiping County, a county in Henan
Xiping, Shanxi (西坪), a town in Datong County, Shanxi
Xiping, Fujian (西坪), a town in Anxi County, Fujian
Xiping, Xixia County (西坪), a town in Xixia County, Henan
Xiping, Guizhou (西坪), a town in Zunyi, Guizhou
Xiping Township (西屏乡), a township in Jiangyou, Sichuan
Xiping Subdistrict, Qujing (西平街道), a subdistrict in Zhanyi District, Qujing, Yunnan
Xiping Subdistrict, Songyang County (西屏街道), a subdistrict in Songyang County, Zhejiang
Xiping Station, a metro station in Dongguan, Guangdong
Xiping, Datong Hui and Tu Autonomous County, Qinghai

Historical eras
Xiping (熹平, 172–178), era name used by Emperor Ling of Han
Xiping (熙平, 516–518), era name used by Emperor Xiaoming of Northern Wei